Isidora or Isadora is a female given name of Greek origin, derived from Ἰσίδωρος, Isídōros (a compound of Ἶσις, Ísis, and δῶρον, dōron: "gift of [the goddess] Isis").

The male equivalent is Isidore.
The name survived the suppression of the worship of the Egyptian goddess Isis in the newly Christianized Roman Empire, and is, among others, the name of several Christian saints.
Similar "gift" names include the Greek "Theodore" and Slavic "Bogdan" (both meaning "gift of God"), the Persian "Mithradates" ("gift of Mithras") and Datis ("gift"), and the Hebrew "Matanya" ("gift of Jah"). The Indo-European "gift" names are ultimately derived from the *PIE root *deh₃-, "to give".

It was the ninth most popular name for baby girls in Chile in 2006.

People 
 Saint Isidora, Christian 4th century saint and nun
 Isadora Bennett (1900–1980), American publicity agent for modern dance theatre
 Isidora Bjelica, (born 1967 - 2020), Serbian writer
 Isadora Cerullo (born 1991), Brazilian-American rugby sevens player
 Isadora Duncan (1877 or 1878–1927), American dancer
 Isadora Newman (1878–1955), American artist, poet, writer, playwright and storyteller
 Isidora Niemeyer (born 2001), Chilean rower
 Isidora Sekulić (1877–1958), Serbian writer and adventurer
 Isadora Williams (born 1996), Brazilian-American figure skater
 Isidora Zegers (1803–1869), Spanish artist and composer
 Isadora Zubillaga (born 1968), Venezuelan diplomat and activist.

Fictional characters
 Isadora Quagmire, in the A Series of Unfortunate Events novel series
 Isadora Smackle, in the American television series Girl Meets World
 Isadore Daniels, in the American film Jump In!
 Isidora is the main antagonist in the DLC ‘’Curse of the Pharaohs’’ for the 2017 game ‘’Assassin's Creed: Origins’’

References

Feminine given names
Spanish feminine given names
Given names
Portuguese feminine given names